The Rovte dialect group (rovtarska narečna skupina, rovtarščina) is a group of closely related dialects of Slovene. The Rovte dialects are spoken in the mountainous areas of west-central Slovenia, on the border between the Slovenian Littoral, Upper Carniola, and Inner Carniola, in a triangle between the towns of Tolmin, Škofja Loka, and Vrhnika.

Phonological and morphological characteristics

Individual dialects and subdialects
 Tolmin dialect (tolminsko narečje, tolminščina)
 Bača subdialect (baški govor)
 Cerkno dialect (cerkljansko narečje, cerkljanščina)
 Poljane dialect (poljansko narečje, poljanščina)
 Škofja Loka dialect (škofjeloško narečje, škofjeloščina)
 Črni Vrh dialect (črnovrško narečje, črnovrščina)
 Horjul dialect (horjulsko narečje, horjulščina)

References

Slovene dialects